Little Bitch is the third album by Tito & Tarantula, released in 2000.

It was the band's first album not to feature bassist Jennifer Condos, and showed a major departure from their former style. Instead, they now incorporated the use of synthesizer moog pedals, giving the music a much stronger pop-rock sound. In addition, they recruited the assistance of several female backing vocalists on most songs, instead of relying on the other band members to back up Tito Larriva's vocals. This musical element is something the band also featured on their next album, 2002's Andalucia, which featured bassist Io Perry singing backing vocals on almost every song. The rest of the new elements featured on Little Bitch were mostly abandoned on Andalucia, which returned a sound more similar to that featured on the band's second album, 1999's Hungry Sally & Other Killer Lullabies.

The album also contained songs written by new songwriters. Charlie Midnight, who had co-written Tito & Tarantula's 1995 hit song "Back to the House (That Love Built)", co-wrote the music for "Everybody Needs". Larriva's former Cruzados bandmate, Steven Hufsteter, co-wrote "Crime & Shame", "World at My Feet" and "Super Vita Jane"; and ended up joining the band as a second lead guitarist. The music for "Dead Person" was co-written by Dominique Davalos, who later became the band's bassist in 2005, and played on the album as a session musician, as the band chose not to hire a replacement for Condos to play on the album.

Track listing

Personnel
Peter Atanasoff – lead guitar, backing vocals
Tito Larriva – rhythm guitar, lead vocals
Johnny "Vatos" Hernandez – drums, percussion, backing vocals

Additional personnel
Dominique Davalos – bass, moog pedals, backing vocals
Andrea Figueroa – violin, mandolin, additional guitar, backing vocals
Bucka Allen – B3, wurlitzer, accordion
John Avila – bass, moog pedals
Marcus Praed – bass, additional guitar, backing vocals, programming, mixing
Annette Niermann – backing vocals
Janet Carroll – backing vocals
Bridgette Feltus – backing vocals
Bron Tieman – mini-moog, programming
Sahil Gupta – the king of the "little bitch" colony located on the 13th floor
Rachel Holt – wishes she were cool enough to be a little bitch, yet she has been relegated to serve the king of the 13th floor; aka now considered: "small bitch"
Weston Gaddy – aka song #8 is about him; vocal surgery will however banish him from the band

Production
André Recke – executive producer, manager
Michael Schwabe – mastering
Mark Howard – co-producer, engineer
Flo Beler – assistant engineer
Guido Preus – assistant engineer

2000 albums
Tito & Tarantula albums